Johann Christiaan Kriegler (born 29 November 1932) is a retired justice of the Constitutional Court of South Africa.

Early life
Born in Pretoria, he matriculated at King Edward VII School in Johannesburg in 1949. He then attended the South African Military Academy for two years. He studied law at the University of Pretoria and the University of South Africa.

Career
After obtaining his LLB degree in 1958, he was called to the Johannesburg Bar in 1959. Kriegler served three times as Chairman and Secretary of the Johannesburg Bar Council, and as Secretary of the General Council of the Bar of South Africa.

He drafted the constitution of the Christian Institute of Southern Africa, became National President of Verligte Aksie and founding Chairman of Lawyers for Human Rights. For some years he served on the Transvaal Board of the Urban Foundation and from 1978 to 1988 was a founding trustee of the Legal Resources Centre.

Between 1976 and 1983, Kriegler served intermittently as an acting judge and in 1984 was appointed to the Transvaal Provincial Division of the Supreme Court. Between 1990 and 1993 he acted in the Appellate Division, then the highest court in the country, and was permanently appointed to its bench in 1993. The following year he was appointed a founding justice of the newly formed Constitutional Court of South Africa and completed his term of office in 2002.

In December 1993 he was appointed Chairperson of the Independent Electoral Commission whose task it was to deliver South Africa's first elections based on universal adult suffrage. In 1999 after months of fighting over the way South Africa's second post-apartheid election should be run, Kriegler resigned.  He said he found "the load" of being both chairman of the commission and a justice of the Constitutional Court "increasingly heavy." He had repeatedly complained of a lack of financing for his agency and criticized the Government's decision to require voters to get new identity documents before registering.  The new requirements were opposed by the two major white political parties and the Inkatha Freedom Party.

Other positions and awards 
Kriegler is currently a trustee of a number of charitable trusts.

In 2008, Kriegler led a commission recommending reforms to the electoral process in Kenya following the crisis after the 2007 presidential election.

Personal life 
Kriegler and his wife have nine children and sixteen grandchildren between them and live in Johannesburg.

References

1932 births
Living people
20th-century South African judges
Academic staff of the University of Pretoria
University of Pretoria alumni
Alumni of King Edward VII School (Johannesburg)
Judges of the Constitutional Court of South Africa
21st-century South African judges